The 37th World Science Fiction Convention (Worldcon), also known as Seacon '79, was held on 23–26 August 1979 at the Metropole Hotel in Brighton, United Kingdom.

The convention committee was chaired by Peter Weston.

Participants 

Attendance was 3,114.

Guests of Honour 

 Brian Aldiss (UK)
 Fritz Leiber (US)
 Harry Bell (fan)
 Bob Shaw (toastmaster)

Awards

1979 Hugo Awards 

 Best Novel: Dreamsnake by Vonda McIntyre
 Best Novella: "The Persistence of Vision" by John Varley
 Best Novelette: "Hunter's Moon" by Poul Anderson
 Best Short Story: "Cassandra" by C. J. Cherryh
 Best Dramatic Presentation: Superman
 Best Professional Editor: Ben Bova
 Best Professional Artist: Vincent DiFate
 Best Fanzine: Science Fiction Review, edited by Richard E. Geis
 Best Fan Writer: Bob Shaw
 Best Fan Artist: Bill Rotsler

Other awards 

 John W. Campbell Award for Best New Writer: Stephen R. Donaldson
 Gandalf Awards:
 Gandalf Grand Master Award: Ursula K. Le Guin
 Gandalf Award for Book-Length Fantasy: The White Dragon by Anne McCaffrey

See also 

 Hugo Award
 Science fiction
 Speculative fiction
 World Science Fiction Society
 Worldcon

References

External links 

 World Science Fiction Society
 NESFA.org: The Long List
 NESFA.org: 1979 convention notes 

1979 conferences
1979 in England
Science fiction conventions in Europe
Science fiction conventions in the United Kingdom
Worldcon